Truckenbrod is a surname. Notable people with the surname include:

Jens Truckenbrod (born 1980), German footballer
Joan Truckenbrod (born 1945), American artist